Louise Drevet, née Marie-Louise Chaffanel (19 December 1835, Grenoble – 23 July 1898, Grenoble) was a French novelist. She was co-founder, editor and contributor to newspaper Le Dauphiné.

Life 
Marie-Louise Chaffanel was born in Grenoble on 19 December 1835 to a family from Grésivaudan. Her first literary work was published in Le Voeu national in 1855. In 1857, she married an editor Xavier Drevet. Together they founded a newspaper Le Dauphiné with the aim to increase awareness of the Dauphiné Alps.

Under the pseudonym Léo Ferry Louise Drevet wrote weekly column for Le Dauphiné and remained its editor for 35 years. At the same time, under her married name Louise Drevet, she published numerous fictionalized works on Dauphinoise legends or local history, grouped under the title Nouvelles et légendes dauphinoises.

Her stories were so popular in the region that she was called the Walter Scott of the Dauphiné. She has also collaborated on works intended to make the Dauphiné better known, such as Les Promenades en Dauphiné. Although it is difficult to estimate the exact number of her publications, Louise Drevet, is said to have written more than 60 novels, short stories and legends.

Louise Drevet died on 23 July 1898 in Grenoble.

A street in Grenoble is named after her.

Works (selection) 

Dauphiné bon cœur, 1876
La Perle du Trièves, 1883
Iserette, 1888
Héros sans gloire, 1889
Nouvelles et légendes dauphinoises, 1891
 Le Petit-fils de Bayard, 1892
 La Dernière Dauphine, Béatrix de Hongrie
Philis de Charce, 1893
Les Légendes de Paladru, 1896
Une aventure de Mandrin, 1898
La Maison des îles du Drac, 1898
Les Bessonnes du Manilier

References 

1835 births
1898 deaths
French women novelists
Writers from Grenoble